{|
{{Infobox ship image
|image=Sir Samuel Hood’s engagement with the French Squadron off Rochefort, Septr. 25, 1806.jpg
|caption=The engagement with the French Squadron off Rochefort, HMS Monarch Capt. Richard Lee, engaging La Minerve, LArmide & La Glore}}

|}Gloire was a 44-gun frigate of the French Navy, lead ship of her class.

She took part in Allemand's expedition of 1805. On 18 July, she captured and burnt a Prussian cutter to maintain the secrecy of the movements of the fleet, in spite of the neutrality of Prussia at the time.

She was brought into British service as HMS Gloire''',  and broken up in 1812.

References
Roche, Jean-Michel (2005) Dictionnaire des Bâtiments de la Flotte de Guerre Française de Colbert à nos Jours.'' (Group Retozel-Maury Millau).

Frigates of the Royal Navy
Ships built in France
Age of Sail frigates of France
1803 ships
Frigates of the French Navy
Gloire-class frigates
Captured ships